Rebecca Ann Staab is an American actress.

Early life 
Staab won the Miss Nebraska USA title and competed in the Miss USA 1980 pageant that year, where she placed in the Top 12.

Acting career 
Before becoming an actress, Staab was a model for the Ford Agency. She made her television debut on Guiding Light in 1985 and appeared in several other shows over the years, including Beverly Hills 90210, The Wonder Years, Seinfeld, Dharma & Greg, Columbo, NCIS, The Mentalist, Desperate Housewives, Live Shot, Port Charles, and The Young and the Restless.

Staab has most recently been seen in several Hallmark Channel television films, and currently has a recurring role in their Chronicle Mysteries series.

Personal life 
Staab is in a relationship with actor William deVry.

Selected filmography

Television

Film

External links 
 Official website

References

Living people
People from Hays, Kansas
American film actresses
American soap opera actresses
American television actresses
American voice actresses
Actresses from Nebraska
Miss USA 1980 delegates
Actresses from Kansas
Miss Nebraska USA winners
20th-century American actresses
21st-century American actresses
American expatriate actresses in Canada
Year of birth missing (living people)